Events from the year 1584 in France

Incumbents
 Monarch – Henry III

Events
31 December – Treaty of Joinville

Births

Full date missing
André Duchesne, historian and geographer (died 1640)
Mathieu Molé, statesman (died 1656)

Deaths

Full date missing
Claude de La Baume, bishop and cardinal (born 1534)
François Dubois, painter (born 1529)
Gentian Hervetus, theologian (born 1499)
Guy Du Faur, Seigneur de Pibrac, jurist and poet (born 1529)
Pierre Reymond, enamelist (born 1513)
Paul de Foix, prelate and diplomat (born 1528)

See also

References

1580s in France